Romilly-sur-Seine (literally Romilly on Seine) is a commune in the Aube department in north-central France.

Population

International relations
Romilly-sur-Seine is twinned with:
  Milford Haven, United Kingdom
  Gotha, Germany
  Lüdenscheid, Germany
  Medicina, Italy
  Uman, Ukraine

Notable people
 Béatrice Saubin (1959–2007), first foreign national to be sentenced to death for drug smuggling in Malaysia

See also
 Communes of the Aube department

References

Communes of Aube
Aube communes articles needing translation from French Wikipedia